San Bernardo is a village in Sonora, Mexico.

Climate

References

Populated places in Sonora